In molecular biology, Glycoside hydrolase family 16 is a family of glycoside hydrolases.

Glycoside hydrolases  are a widespread group of enzymes that hydrolyse the glycosidic bond between two or more carbohydrates, or between a carbohydrate and a non-carbohydrate moiety. A classification system for glycoside hydrolases, based on sequence similarity, has led to the definition of >100 different families. This classification is available on the CAZy web site, and also discussed at CAZypedia, an online encyclopedia of carbohydrate active enzymes. y[ _]9

Glycoside hydrolase family 16 CAZY GH_16 comprises enzymes with a number of known activities; lichenase; xyloglucan xyloglucosyltransferase; agarase; kappa-carrageenase; endo-beta-1,3-glucanase; endo-beta-1,3-1,4-glucanase; endo-beta-galactosidase.

References 

EC 3.2.1
GH family
Protein families